Frode Birkeland (born 25 January 1972) is a retired Norwegian football striker and later manager.

Career
In his early career he played for Bergen-based minnows Minde, Varegg, Vadmyra and Lyngbø, also with a spell in larger club Sogndal in 1990. In 1996 he got a break anew, as he moved from Lyngbø to 1. divisjon club Åsane.

In 1997 he moved on to fellow second-tier club Eik-Tønsberg, then Lyn in 1999. With Lyn he managed promotion to 2001 Eliteserien. In 2001 he also had a trial with Sheffield United, and was allegedly close to a contract, but then Paul Peschisolido and Carl Asaba returned from injury and the transfer fell through. Birkeland instead moved on to Lillestrøm in mid-2002, Hamarkameratene in 2003 and Kongsvinger in mid-2004. He retired from professional football after the 2005 season, but featured for minnows Hamar IL.

He started his coaching career in 2006 for the B team of HamKam, then coached Gjøvik-Lyn in 2007. After one year he was picked up by Lillestrøm and put in charge of their B team. From 2010 through 2012 he was the head coach of Drøbak-Frogn, achieving promotion from 3. divisjon, and from 2013 through 2016 he worked for Hønefoss, both as goalkeeping coach and assistant manager. In 2017 he signed a one-year contract as assistant coach to Magnus Powell in Levanger FK. Seeing the contract through, he moved south to become goalkeeper coach of IK Start in 2018.

On 21 June 2021 it was confirmed, that Birkeland had been hired as a goalkeeper coach for Danish 1st Division club Esbjerg fB.

References

1972 births
Living people
Footballers from Bergen
Norwegian footballers
Sogndal Fotball players
Åsane Fotball players
Eik-Tønsberg players
Lyn Fotball players
Lillestrøm SK players
Hamarkameratene players
Kongsvinger IL Toppfotball players
Norwegian First Division players
Eliteserien players
Association football forwards
Norwegian football managers
Hamarkameratene non-playing staff
Lillestrøm SK non-playing staff
IK Start non-playing staff